The 1953 Nippon Professional Baseball season was the fourth season of operation of Nippon Professional Baseball (NPB).

That season would be the first to be televised on the young NHK General TV - which opened that year. The young channel and its then few national relay stations aired some games during the year, tying baseball to the young TV industry and thus beginning the sports connection to Japanese television, as well as its transformation into the top sport of the nation.

Regular season

Standings

Postseason

Japan Series

League leaders

Central League

Pacific League

Awards
Most Valuable Player
Takumi Otomo, Yomiuri Giants (CL)
Isami Okamoto, Nankai Hawks (PL)
Rookie of the Year
Masatoshi Gondo, Taiyo Shochiku Robins (CL)
Yasumitsu Toyoda, Nishitetsu Lions (PL)
Eiji Sawamura Award
Takumi Otomo, Yomiuri Giants (CL)

See also
1953 All-American Girls Professional Baseball League season
1953 Major League Baseball season

References